Ischaemum byrone is a rare species of grass known by the common name Hilo murainagrass or Hilo ischaemum. It is endemic to Hawaii, where it is present on Kauai, Maui, Molokai, and Hawaii. It was known from Oahu but it is now extirpated there. There are perhaps 1000 to 3000 individual plants remaining in total. This is a federally listed endangered species of the United States.

It usually grows at the coastline, often in cracks in the lava cliffs.

On the island of Hawaii there are at least four populations and perhaps more scattered occurrences. At least one large occurrence has been recently destroyed by a lava flow at Hawaiʻi Volcanoes National Park. There are at least five occurrences on Kauai and six on Maui with up to several thousand plants existing. On Molokai, a 1994 count estimated about 1000 individuals.

Threats to this species include volcanism, development, trampling, non-native plants, fire, and off-road vehicles.

References

External links
USDA Plants Profile

byrone
Endemic flora of Hawaii